Ahsham is a 2015 Maldivian action film directed and produced by Ali Seezan. Produced under the banner S Productions, the film stars Seezan, Ahmed Saeed and Aminath Rishfa in pivotal roles. The film was released on 6 November 2015, and was one of the three entries from the Maldives to the SAARC Film Festival 2016.

Cast
 Ali Seezan as Ahsham
 Ahmed Saeed as Jawid
 Aminath Rishfa as Maeesha
 Zeenath Abbas as Nashidha
 Arifa Ibrahim as Haajara
 Roanu Hassan Manik as Ibrahim
 Mohamed Waheed as Faththah
 Mohamed Manik as Najeeb
 Niuma Mohamed as Ina (Special appearance)

Development 
Ahsham marks the first production from the S. Productions company established in 2015 and owned by the director and actor of the film, Ali Seezan. The film was made on a budget of MVR 1,500,000, and was considered to be the most expensive film made in the Maldivian film industry. It was also publicised as the most risky and challenging Maldivian film that has been released.

The first look of the film and the title was launched on 6 August 2015. Shooting of the film commenced on 9 August 2016 at Hdh. Kulhudhuffushi. It was reported that Seezan will play the role of a police inspector while Rishfa will portray the role of a nurse.

Release and response
The film was initially slated for release on 6 November 2015. However, the premiere of the film was delayed since Maldives Police Service wanted to watch the film while in the process of classification as the film involves several aspects relating to their services.

The film received a mixed to positive response from critics. Ahmed Nadheem from Avas, applauded the hard work and continuous effort brought while producing the film, and for making a film on the genre which the Maldivian audience is not quite familiar with. He considered the film as a "big project" but not a "great film". "This is a very different taste to the Maldivian Film Industry. However, I do not like the film because there is no originality in the film".

Soundtrack

Accolades

References

External links 
 

2015 films
2015 action drama films
Maldivian action drama films
Films directed by Ali Seezan
Dhivehi-language films